Paolo Salvatore Vacirca (born 31 October 1982), is a Swedish screenwriter and story developer, and former head of development/development executive at AB Svensk Filmindustri.

He is the scriptwriter of the film The Hypnotist based on the best seller by Lars Kepler.

References

Swedish film directors
1982 births
Living people